Speolabeo musaei is a species of cyprinid cavefish endemic to the Xe Bang Fai River in Laos. It is the only species in the genus Speolabeo, but it was formerly included in Bangana.

References

Labeoninae
Fish described in 2011
Cave fish
Taxobox binomials not recognized by IUCN